The Oodians were an Armenian tribe that once inhabited the Armenian province of Oodi.

References

Prehistoric Armenia